Agricenter Showplace Arena  is a sports arena located in Cordova, Tennessee. It was built in 1985 and holds 4,500 people. It is not a host to the Memphis Mojo indoor soccer franchise. It is known mainly for its rodeos that it hosts.
https://web.archive.org/web/20110905034821/http://www.agricenter.org/showplacearena.html

Indoor arenas in Tennessee
Sports venues in Tennessee
Buildings and structures in Shelby County, Tennessee